I Feel Alright is the sixth studio album by Steve Earle, released in 1996.

Critical reception

Writing for Entertainment Weekly, Alanna Nash gave I Feel Alright an "A" grade. She wrote, "If I Feel Alright doesn’t deliver the grit that has been Earle’s gift to rock and country, his roots-rock joie de vivre sends no apologies, only a healthy message for the ’90s: Don’t feel bad about feeling good."

Accolades

Track listing

Personnel

Musicians 
 Steve Earle — guitars, harmonica, vocals
Richard Bennett, Ray Kennedy - guitar
Kelly Looney, Garry Tallent, Roy Huskey, Jr., Ric Kipp - bass
Kurt Custer, Greg Morrow - drums
Ken Moore - organ 
Richard Bennett - harmonium
Lucinda Williams - vocals on "You're Still Standin' There"
Kurt Custer, Richard Bennett, Greg Morrow, Dub Cornett - percussion
Custer & Logan, The Fairfield Four (musical director: Mark Prentice), Lucinda Williams, Ms. Williams' stunt double Siobhan Maher - vocals
Kris Wilkerson - string arrangement and conductor 
Carl Gordetzky, Pamela Sixfin, Richard Grosjean - violin
Lee Larrison - viola
Robert Mason - cello

Cover Art 
 Album Artwork - Tony Fitzpatrick

Production 
Ray Kennedy and Richard Bennett (tracks: 1, 5, 8 to 12), Richard Dodd (tracks: 2 to 4, 6 and 7)

Releases

Charts

Notes and sources 

1996 albums
Steve Earle albums
Albums produced by Richard Bennett (guitarist)